Foreign relations exist between Austria and Netherlands. Austria has an embassy in The Hague and 2 honorary consulates (in Amsterdam and Rotterdam). The Netherlands have an embassy in Vienna and 6 honorary consulates (in Bludenz, Innsbruck, Graz, Klagenfurt, Salzburg and Linz). 
Both countries are full members of the European Union.

See also 
 Foreign relations of Austria
 Foreign relations of the Netherlands

External links 
List of bilateral treaties between both countries: Austria Ministry of Foreign Affairs (in German only) 
Austrian embassy in The Hague (in Dutch and German only)  
Dutch Ministry of Foreign Affairs about the relation with Austria (in Dutch only) 
Dutch embassy in Vienna (in Dutch and German only)

 

 
Netherlands
Austria